The 2014 Vuelta a El Salvador is the ninth edition of a stage race held in El Salvador, with a UCI rating of 2.1. It is the fourth stage race of the 2014 Women's Elite cycling calendar.

Teams
Elite UCI Women's teams
Astana BePink
RusVelo
UnitedHealthcare
Servetto-Zhiraf
Hitec Products UCK

Women's teams
Vanderkitten
DNA Cycling p/b K4 Racing
Fundación San Mateo — IDRD — Bogotá Humana
Pedalea CON Nosostras

National teams
Mexico
Colombia
Brazil
Guatemala

Stages

Prologue
11 March 2014 – Nuevo Cuscatlán, individual time trial (ITT)

Stage 1
12 March 2014 – La Libertad to Nahuizalco,

Stage 2
13 March 2014 – San Marcos - Zacatecoluca - San Marcos,

Stage 3
14 March 2014 – Nueva Concepción - Santa Ana,

Stage 4
15 March 2014 – Santa Tecla - El Boquerón,

Stage 5
16 March 2014 – Santa Tecla to San Luis Talpa,

Classification leadership table
 General classification: the rider with the lowest overall accumulated time
 Points classification: the rider who has scored the highest number of points
 Sprints classification: the rider who has scored the highest number of points from intermediate sprints
 Mountains classification: the rider who has scored the highest number of points from specified climbs
 Combativity classification: the rider who has been the most aggressive
 Young rider classification: the rider with the lowest overall accumulated time under a specified age
 Best Salvadorean rider: the rider with the lowest overall accumulated time from El Salvador
Source

Source

References

2014 in women's road cycling
2014 in Salvadoran sport
Vuelta a El Salvador